Viktor Vlasov may refer to:

 Viktor Vlasov (basketball) (1925–2002), Russian basketball player
 Viktor Vlasov (sport shooter) (born 1951), former Soviet sport shooter